Alexidine is an antimicrobial of the biguanide class. More specifically, it is a bisbiguanide.

References

Antimicrobials
Biguanides